Palestinian Freedom Movement is a Palestinian political party. Initially known as Fatah al-Yasir, the organization was created after the Hamas takeover of the Gaza Strip in June 2007. The party was formed by former Fatah members headed by Khalid Abu-Hilal, spokesman of the previous Hamas-led government. The party is named after Yasir Arafat. The party does not recognize the authority of Mahmoud Abbas and shares Hamas' view that the current Fatah leadership is corrupt and treacherous. The party believe in armed struggle to end the Israeli occupation of the West Bank and Gaza Strip.

It has an armed wing, Kataeb al-Ansar.

External links
www.alahrar.ps

References

Palestinian militant groups
Palestinian nationalist parties
2007 establishments in the Palestinian territories